Geoffrey Howard [Geoff] Eley (born 4 May 1949) is a British-born historian of Germany. He studied history at Balliol College, Oxford, and received his PhD from the University of Sussex in 1974. He has taught at the University of Michigan, Ann Arbor in the Department of History since 1979 and the Department of German Studies since 1997. He now serves as the Karl Pohrt Distinguished University Professor of Contemporary History at Michigan.

Eley's early work focused on the radical nationalism in Imperial Germany and fascism, but has since grown to include theoretical and methodological reflections on historiography and the history of the political left in Europe.

Eley is particularly well known for his early study, The Peculiarities of German History (first published in German as Mythen deutscher Geschichtsschreibung in 1984), co-authored with David Blackbourn (a fellow Briton, who now teaches at Vanderbilt University), which challenged the  orthodoxy in German social history known as the Sonderweg thesis. His most successful book is Forging Democracy: The History of the Left in Europe, 1850-2000, which has been translated into Spanish, Portuguese, Serbian, Korean, Turkish and Greek. Recently, he published a collection of essays on fascism called Nazism as Fascism: Violence, Ideology, and the Ground of Consent in Germany, 1930-1945 with Routledge Press.

Works 
(This list does not include edited volumes.)
 Nazism as Fascism: Violence, Ideology, and the Ground of Consent in Germany, 1930-1945. London: Routledge, 2013 
 After the Nazi Racial State: Difference and Democracy in Germany and Europe. Ann Arbor: University of Michigan Press, 2009.   
 The Future of Class in History: What's Left of the Social? (with Keith Nield). Ann Arbor: University of Michigan Press, 2007. 
 A Crooked Line: From Cultural History to the History of Society. Ann Arbor: University of Michigan Press, 2005.  
 Forging Democracy: The History of the Left in Europe, 1850-2000. New York: Oxford University Press, 2002. 
 Reshaping the German Right: Radical Nationalism and Political Change after Bismarck. London and New Haven: Yale University Press, 1980; new ed. 1991. 
 Wilhelminismus, Nationalismus, Faschismus: Zur historischen Kontinuität in Deutschland. Münster: Verlag Westfälisches Dampfboot, 1991. 
 Review article: "Labor History, Social History, Alltagsgeschichte: Experience, Culture, and the Politics of the Everyday--a New Direction for German Social History?" The Journal of Modern History Vol. 61, No. 2, June 1989
 From Unification to Nazism: Reinterpreting the German Past. London: Routledge, 1986.  
 The Peculiarities of German History (with David Blackbourn). Oxford: Oxford University Press, 1984.

External links 
 Faculty page on Eley at the University of Michigan
 Geoff Eley, "No Need to Choose: History from Above, History from Below", Viewpoint Magazine, June 2014.

Alumni of the University of Sussex
British Marxist historians
University of Michigan faculty
1949 births
Living people
Alumni of Balliol College, Oxford